Rinorea melanodonta is a species of tree native to countries such as Colombia, Venezuela, Trinidad-Tobago, and Guyana. It occurs at an elevation range from 200 to 300 meters.

It is related to Rinorea brachythrix but is differentiated by the short filaments. This species can also grow up to 4 to 5 meters tall.

References

melanodonta